Charles Everett Traynor (August 21, 1937 – July 22, 2002) was an American businessman and talent agent best known for having promoted the careers of pornographic film stars Linda Lovelace and Marilyn Chambers, both of whom were also married to him. Lovelace wrote in her autobiography Ordeal (1980) that Traynor was abusive during their marriage and had threatened and coerced her into her role in the pornographic film Deep Throat (1972).

Career
Traynor was a minor figure in the early US East Coast pornographic film industry and appeared in a number of short "loops" in the early 1970s, usually with his then-wife, Linda Lovelace. He was the production manager of the 1972 movie Deep Throat.

Relationship with Linda Lovelace
In a 1980 article in Ms. magazine, "The Real Linda Lovelace", Gloria Steinem discussed Traynor and Lovelace's relationship. Steinem stated that "the myth that Lovelace loved to be sexually used and humiliated was created by her husband" and that he kept her as his prisoner. Lovelace claimed that Traynor forced her into prostitution by threatening her with a gun, repeatedly beat her, forced her to make pornography, and allowed men to rape her repeatedly. Lovelace tried to escape from Traynor three times before she was successful. She said that during Deep Throat one can see scars and bruises left on her legs from a beating by Traynor. According to Steinem, Traynor once stated, "When I first dated [Linda] she was so shy, it shocked her to be seen nude by a man... I created Linda Lovelace."

In 1979, Lovelace underwent a polygraph examination in which she repeated allegations she made against Traynor. During the session the test results supported the following allegations:

 In 1971, Traynor forced Lovelace to have sex with five men for money in the Coral Gables Holiday Inn. He pointed a gun at Lovelace and threatened to kill her if she refused.
 During her relationship with Traynor, Lovelace feared for her life if she tried to leave him.
 He would hypnotize her.
 He asked her to help him run the prostitution business, and when she refused he hit her. He used to beat her occasionally, which seemed to sexually excite him. He beat her the night before their wedding and during the filming of Deep Throat.
 After she left him, Traynor threatened to shoot her sister's son if she did not return.
 When out with other people, he would tell her not to speak, and she had to ask his permission to use the toilet.
 The movie Deep Throat made approximately $600 million but Lovelace did not receive any money from the film and said that her husband received around $1,250 for the project. Traynor kept control of the money.

In a Vanity Fair article on Marilyn Chambers, whom Traynor married after Lovelace divorced him, Traynor said he considered himself a country boy in that he could live away from civilization and that if his woman said something he didn't like, he thought nothing of hitting her for it.

Lovelace's allegations against Traynor have been disputed since she voiced them but in the second commentary on the DVD of "Inside Deep Throat," one member of the production crew of Deep Throat backed up Lovelace's allegation of a brutal beating that she claimed left bruises that are visible in the film. The man said his motel room was next to Lovelace and Traynor's and emphatically stated that Traynor beat Lovelace viciously at night. Marilyn Chambers later claimed that Linda's allegations "hurt Chuck," but Deep Throat, Part 2 actress Andrea True said that most people did not like Chuck Traynor and sided with Lovelace as to her allegations.

Traynor was portrayed by actor Peter Sarsgaard in the 2013 film Lovelace.

Death
Traynor died at the age of 64 of a heart attack in Chatsworth, California, on July 22, 2002, three months after Lovelace died from massive trauma and internal injuries as a result of a car accident in Colorado. Lovelace's sister, Barbara Boreman, later said in an interview in Inside Deep Throat that she was disappointed that Traynor died before she could kill him.

In media
 The song "I'm Coming Up Your Ass" from  Great White Death (album) is "dedicated to Chuck Traynor".
 Peter Sarsgaard starred as Chuck Traynor in the biographical film Lovelace based on his first wife.

References

External links

1937 births
2002 deaths
American pornographers
Eastchester High School alumni
American male film actors
20th-century American male actors